A lateral is a consonant in which the airstream proceeds along one or both of the sides of the tongue, but it is blocked by the tongue from going through the middle of the mouth. An example of a lateral consonant is the English L, as in Larry. Lateral consonants contrast with central consonants, in which the airstream flows through the center of the mouth.

For the most common laterals, the tip of the tongue makes contact with the upper teeth (see dental consonant) or the upper gum (see alveolar consonant), but there are many other possible places for laterals to be made. The most common laterals are approximants and belong to the class of liquids, but lateral fricatives and affricates are also common in some parts of the world. Some languages, such as the Iwaidja and Ilgar languages of Australia, have  lateral flaps, and others, such as the Xhosa and Zulu languages of Africa, have lateral clicks.

When pronouncing the labiodental fricatives , the lip blocks the airflow in the centre of the vocal tract, so the airstream proceeds along the sides instead. Nevertheless, they are not considered lateral consonants because the airflow never goes over the side of the tongue. No known language makes a distinction between lateral and non-lateral labiodentals. Plosives are never lateral, but they may have lateral release. Nasals are never lateral either, but some languages have lateral nasal clicks. For consonants articulated in the throat (laryngeals), the lateral distinction is not made by any language, although pharyngeal and epiglottal laterals are reportedly possible.

Examples

English has one lateral phoneme: the lateral approximant , which in many accents has two allophones. One, found before vowels as in lady or fly, is called clear l, pronounced as the alveolar lateral approximant  with a "neutral" position of the body of the tongue. The other variant, so-called dark l, found before consonants or word-finally, as in bold or tell, is pronounced as the velarized alveolar lateral approximant  with the tongue assuming a spoon-like shape with its back part raised, which gives the sound a - or -like resonance. In some languages, like Albanian, those two sounds are different phonemes. East Slavic languages contrast  and  but do not have [l].

In many British accents (e.g. Cockney), dark  may undergo vocalization through the reduction and loss of contact between the tip of the tongue and the alveolar ridge, becoming a rounded back vowel or glide. This process turns tell into , as must have happened with talk  or walk  at some stage. A similar process happened during the development of many other languages, including Brazilian Portuguese, Old French, and Polish, in all three of these resulting in voiced velar approximant  or voiced labio-velar approximant , whence Modern French sauce as compared with Spanish salsa, or Polish Wisła (pronounced ) as compared with English Vistula.

In central and Venice dialects of Venetian, intervocalic  has turned into a semivocalic , so that the written word ła bała is pronounced . The orthography uses the letter ł to represent this phoneme (it specifically represents not the  sound but the phoneme that is, in some dialects,  and, in others).

Many aboriginal Australian languages have a series of three or four lateral approximants, as do various dialects of Irish. Rarer lateral consonants include the retroflex laterals that can be found in many languages of India and in some Swedish dialects, and the voiceless alveolar lateral fricative , found in many Native North American languages, Welsh and Zulu. In Adyghe and some Athabaskan languages like Hän, both voiceless and voiced alveolar lateral fricatives occur, but there is no approximant. Many of these languages also have lateral affricates. Some languages have palatal or velar voiceless lateral fricatives or affricates, such as Dahalo and Zulu, but the IPA has no symbols for such sounds. However, appropriate symbols are easy to make by adding a lateral-fricative belt to the symbol for the corresponding lateral approximant (see below). Also, a devoicing diacritic may be added to the approximant.

Nearly all languages with such lateral obstruents also have the approximant. However, there are a number of exceptions, many of them located in the Pacific Northwest area of the United States. For example, Tlingit has  but no . Other examples from the same area include Nuu-chah-nulth and Kutenai, and elsewhere, Chukchi and Kabardian.

Standard Tibetan has a voiceless lateral approximant, usually romanized as lh, as in the name Lhasa.

A uvular lateral approximant has been reported to occur in some speakers of American English.

Pashto has a retroflex lateral flap that becomes voiced retroflex approximant when it is at the end of a syllable and a word.

There are a large number of lateral click consonants; 17 occur in !Xóõ.

Lateral trills are also possible, but they do not occur in any known language. There is no symbol for them in the IPA. They are sometimes used to imitate bird calls, and they are a component of Donald Duck talk.

List of laterals

Approximants
 Voiced dental lateral approximant 
 Voiced alveolar lateral approximant 
 Voiced retroflex lateral approximant 
 Voiced palatal lateral approximant 
 Voiced velar lateral approximant 
 Voiced uvular lateral approximant

Fricatives
 Voiceless dental lateral fricative  (in Wahgi)
 Voiced dental lateral fricative  (allophonic in Wahgi)
 Voiceless alveolar lateral fricative  (in Adyghe, Chukchi, Kabardian, Navajo, Welsh)
 Voiced alveolar lateral fricative  (in Adyghe, Kabardian, Mongolian, Tigak)
 Voiceless retroflex lateral fricative  (in Toda)
 Voiced retroflex lateral fricative  or extIPA  (in Ao)
 Voiced palatal lateral fricative  or extIPA  (allophonic in Jebero)
 Voiceless velar lateral fricative  or extIPA  (in Archi, Nii, Wahgi)
 Voiced velar lateral fricative  or extIPA  (in Archi, allophonic in Wahgi)

Only the alveolar lateral fricatives have dedicated letters in the IPA. However, others appear in the extIPA.

Affricates
 Voiceless alveolar lateral affricate  (in Navajo, Tlingit)
 Voiced alveolar lateral affricate  (allophonic in Zulu and Xhosa)
 Voiceless retroflex lateral affricate  (in Kamkata-vari)
 Voiced retroflex lateral affricate  or extIPA  (in Kamkata-vari)
 Voiceless palatal lateral affricate  or extIPA  (perhaps prepalatal in Sandawe and Hadza)
 Voiced palatal lateral affricate  (perhaps prepalatal in Sandawe)
 Voiceless velar lateral affricate  or extIPA  (in Archi, Laghuu, Muji)
 Voiced velar lateral affricate  (in Hiw, Laghuu, Muji)

Flaps
 Voiceless alveolar lateral flap  (in Yavitero)
 Voiced alveolar lateral flap  (in Wayuu)
 Palatal lateral flap  (allophonic in Iwaidja and Ilgar)
 Velar lateral flap  (in Kanite and Melpa)

Ejective

Fricatives
 Alveolar lateral ejective fricative  (in Adyghe, Kabardian, Tlingit)
 Retroflex lateral ejective fricative 
 Palatal lateral ejective fricative  or extIPA 
 Velar lateral ejective fricative  or extIPA 

Only the alveolar  has been attested in natural languages.

Affricates
 Alveolar lateral ejective affricate  (in Baslaney, Navajo, Tlingit)
 Palatal lateral ejective affricate  or extIPA  (in Dahalo, Sandawe, Hadza)
 Velar lateral ejective affricate  or extIPA  (in Archi, Gǀwi, Zulu)
 Uvular lateral ejective affricate  or extIPA  (in Gǀui, ǂʼAmkoe)

Clicks
(in all five Khoisan families and several Bantu languages)

Ambiguous centrality
The IPA requires sounds to be defined as to centrality, as either central or lateral. However, languages may be ambiguous as to some consonants' laterality.

Lateralized consonants
A superscript  is defined as lateral release.

Consonants may also be pronounced with simultaneous lateral and central airflow. This is well-known from speech pathology with a lateral lisp. Examples are  'pain' in the dialect of Al-Rubu'ah and  'back' and   'hyena' in Rijal Almaa.
 (Here the  indicates simultaneous laterality rather than lateral release.)

See also
 Delateralization
 Lateral release (phonetics)
 List of phonetics topics

Notes

References

Sources

 
 
 

Consonants by manner of articulation